Brongniartella is a genus of red alga in the family Rhodomelaceae.

Brongniartella may also refer to:

Brongniartella, a genus of trilobite in the family Homalonotidae

See also
Adolphe-Théodore Brongniart